Bradina argentata is a moth in the family Crambidae. It was described by Arthur Gardiner Butler in 1887. It is found on the Solomon Islands.

References

Moths described in 1887
Bradina